A sweatshop is a working environment with very difficult conditions.

Sweatshop may also refer to: 

 Game sweatshop, a business concerned with exploiting the need for in-game resources in massively multiplayer online role-playing games
Sweatshop, a 2004 adult film directed by Brad Armstrong
sweatshop (retailer), a chain of sports clothing shops in the UK
Sweatshop (album), a 1990 album by jazz guitarist Joe Morris
Sweatshop (film), a 2009 film